Bibi Sahib Kaur (1771–1801) was a Sikh princess and elder sister of Raja Sahib Singh Sidhu of Patiala. Her brother recalled her after her marriage and appointed her prime minister in 1793. She led armies into battle against the marathas and was one of few Punjabi Sikh women to win battles against a Maratha general Antta rao.

George Thomas an Irish adventure who ruled over the Kingdom of Hisar and Hansi of present-day Haryana state was keen to expand its territory and turned his attention towards the Sikh territories on his northern frontier and marched towards the Jind along with his force. Sahib Kaur battled the forces of George Thomas and forced him to withdraw from the Jind.

References

Sources
"Bibi Sahib Kaur (1771 - 1801 A.D.)", URL accessed 09/02/06

1771 births
1801 deaths
Female Sikh warriors
Indian princesses
People from British India
People from Patiala
Women in 18th-century warfare
Punjabi people
18th-century Indian women
18th-century Indian people